The 1945 French constitutional referendum in Algeria was held in Algeria on 21 October 1945 as part of a wider French constitutional referendum. 

Both referendum questions were approved by voters, with a turnout of 68.3%.

Results

Question I

Question II

References

1945 referendums
October 1945 events in Africa
1945
1945
1945 in Algeria
Constitutional referendums in France